Bez struje  is a various artists live album, released in 1994, recorded on the unplugged festival held in 1994 in Sava Centar, Belgrade, Serbia. The album features eighteen Serbian (mostly rock) acts.

Track listing

References
Bez struje at Discogs

External links

Pop rock albums by Serbian artists
Reggae albums by Serbian artists
Blues rock albums by Serbian artists
1994 live albums
Pop rock compilation albums
Blues compilation albums
Reggae compilation albums
Serbian-language live albums